Technical Higher Secondary School, Cherthala, Cherthala, India, was established as the 24th under the Institute of Human Resources Development (IHRD). All these institutions come under the  guidance of the director, IHRD, Trivandrum. Under the aegis of The Institute of Human resources Development, Trivandrum,  Higher Secondary Level studies (Stds XI and XII) are functioning in the school. There are two groups, Physical  Science  and Integrated Science.

Admission 
Admission to std XI is based on merit obtained in THSLC or SSLC for Physical Science group, pass in SSLC/THSLC or its equivalent with Mathematics as one of subjects. For Integrated Science, pass in SSLC or its equivalent with Biology and Mathematics as subjects of study.

THSE (Higher Secondary Level)  
For Higher Secondary Level, two courses are offered:
 Physical Science
In addition to the vocational subjects like Electronics Service Technology, Computer Information Technology, the syllabus prescribed by NCERT is followed
 Integrated Science
In addition to the Computer Information Technology, the syllabus prescribed by NCERT (including Biology) is followed. 

For standard XI an internal examination is conducted and successful completion leads to the awarding of THSE (Technical Higher Secondary Examination Certificate) by the board of Higher Secondary Education of the government of Kerala.

Co-Curricular activities 
Co-curricular activities include literacy house, quiz programmes, art festivals and sport meets.

References

External links 
Technical Higher Secondary School, Cherthala page at Institute of Human Resources Development

Schools in Alappuzha district
Educational institutions established in 2004
High schools and secondary schools in Kerala
2004 establishments in Kerala